The 12th Australian Recording Industry Association Music Awards (generally known as the ARIA Music Awards or simply The ARIAS) was held on 20 October 1998 at the Sydney Convention & Exhibition Centre. Presenters, including Democrats deputy leader Natasha Stott Despoja and former Prime Minister Gough Whitlam, distributed 29 awards with the big winner Natalie Imbruglia receiving six trophies.

In addition to previous categories, a new category Best Rock Album, was presented to the Superjesus for Sumo. An Outstanding Achievement Award was presented to Savage Garden for "world sales of 8 million and counting." The ARIA Hall of Fame inducted: the Angels and the Masters Apprentices.

Ceremony details

The ceremony was hosted by comedian and TV presenter Paul McDermott with a capacity crowd of 1900 attending. Presenters (see below for full list) distributed 29 trophies. Best Group winners the Whitlams received their award from the group's namesake Gough Whitlam. The former Prime Minister announced "It's my family." Once on stage the members knelt at his feet. Upon accepting Savage Garden's award for Outstanding Achievement – selling more than eight million copies world-wide – band member Darren Hayes reflected, "My nephew told me not to come home without the Wiggles' autographs."

Presenters and performers 

The ARIA Awards ceremony was hosted by Australian comedian and TV presenter Paul McDermott. Presenters and performers were:

Awards

Final nominees for awards are shown in plain, with winners in bold.

ARIA Awards

Album of the Year 
Regurgitator – Unit
Natalie Imbruglia – Left of the Middle
Kylie Minogue – Impossible Princess
The Whitlams – Eternal Nightcap
You Am I – #4 Record
Single of the Year 
Natalie Imbruglia – "Torn"
The Living End – "Second Solution / Prisoner of Society"
The Mavis's – "Cry"
Kylie Minogue – "Did It Again"
The Whitlams – "No Aphrodisiac"
Highest Selling Album 
Savage Garden – Savage Garden
John Farnham – Anthology
Midnight Oil – 20,000 Watt R.S.L.
The 12th Man – Bill Lawry... This Is Your Life
Tina Arena – In Deep

Highest Selling Single 
The Living End – "Second Solution / Prisoner of Society"
John Farnham & Human Nature – "Every Time You Cry"
Natalie Imbruglia – "Big Mistake"
Natalie Imbruglia – "Torn"
Tina Arena – "Burn"

Best Group
The Whitlams – Eternal Nightcap
Regurgitator – Unit
Savage Garden – "Universe"
The Superjesus – Sumo
You Am I – #4 Record
Best Female Artist 
Natalie Imbruglia – Left of the Middle
Tina Arena – In Deep
Monique Brumby – Thylacine
Kate Ceberano – "Pash"
Kylie Minogue – Impossible Princess
Best Male Artist
Paul Kelly – Words and Music
Ed Kuepper – Live!
Mark Seymour – King Without a Clue
Matt Walker – I Listen to the Night
Chris Wilson – The Long Weekend
Best New Talent
Natalie Imbruglia – Left of the Middle
Bachelor Girl – "Buses and Trains"
Groove Terminator – "Losing Ground"
Diana Anaid – "I Go Off"
Marie Wilson – "Next Time"
Breakthrough Artist – Album
Natalie Imbruglia – Left of the Middle
Cordrazine – From Here to Wherever
Grinspoon – Guide to Better Living
Jebediah – Slightly Odway
The Superjesus – Sumo
Breakthrough Artist – Single
Natalie Imbruglia – "Torn"
Hot Rollers – "Wickerman Shoes"
Diana Anaid – "I Go Off"
Primary – "Vicious Precious"
Marie Wilson – "Next Time"
Best Dance Release
Sgt Slick – White Treble, Black Bass
Endorphin – Embrace
Friendly – Hello Bellybutton
Frontside – "Dammerung" / "Mind Distortion"
Pee Wee Ferris – Social Narcotic
Best Pop Release 
Natalie Imbruglia – Left of the Middle
The Mavis's – Pink Pills
Kylie Minogue – Impossible Princess
Snout – Circle High and Wide
The Whitlams – Eternal Nightcap
Best Rock Album
The Superjesus - Sumo
The Angels - Skin & Bone
Moler - Golden Duck
Ricaine - The Clarity of Distance
The Screaming Jets - World Gone Crazy
Best Country Album
Shanley Del – My Own Sweet Time
Colin Buchanan – Edge of the Kimberley
Troy Cassar-Daley – True Believer
Gina Jeffreys – Someboy's Daughter
The Wheel – The Wheel
Best Independent Release 
The Whitlams – Eternal Nightcap
The Blackeyed Susans – Spin the Bottle
Karma County – Olana
The Living End – "Second Solution / Prisoner of Society"
TISM – www.tism.wanker.com
Best Alternative Release 
Regurgitator – Unit
Dirty Three – Ocean Songs
The Living End – "Second Solution / Prisoner of Society"
The Paradise Motel – Flight Paths
You Am I – #4 Record
Best Indigenous Release 
Archie Roach – Looking for Butter Boy
Gondwana – Xenophon
Singers for the Red Black and Gold – "Yil Lull"
John Williamson & Warren H Williams – Raining on the Rock
Bart Willoughby – Pathways
Best Adult Contemporary Album 
Archie Roach – Looking for Butter Boy
David Campbell – Taking the Wheel
Colin Hay – Transcendental Highway
The Killjoys – Sun Bright Deep
Wendy Matthews – Ghosts
Best Comedy Release 
Paul McDermott – Unplugged Good News Week Tapes Volume 1
The 12th Man – Bill Lawry... This Is Your Life
Jimeoin – Forklift Truck
John Safran – "Not the Sunscreen Song"
The Squirrel Grippers – Nine Inch Males

Fine Arts Awards
Best Jazz Album 
Chaplin, Tinkler, Rex, Lamble – The Future in Today
Joe Chindamo – Anyone Who Had a Heart
Kevin Hunt – Plays JS Bach
Shelley Scown with the Paul Grabowsky Trio – Angel
Rolf Stube – The Jazz Police
Best Classical Album 
Yvonne Kenny, Paul Dyer, Australian Brandenburg Orchestra – Handel: Arias
Tamara Anna Cislowska – The Persian Hours
Slava Grigoryan – Dance of the Angels
Karin Schaupp – Leyenda
Sydney Alpha Ensemble – Elena Kats-Chernin Clocks
Best Children's Album 
The Wiggles – Toot Toot!
The Flowerpot Gang - Happy Little Flower Pots
The Hooley Dooleys – Ready Set... Go!
George Spartels – Let's Go Out
Don Spencer – Australian Classics
Best Original Soundtrack / Cast / Show Recording 
Original Cast Recording – The Boy from Oz
The Necks – The Boys
Cezary Skubiszewski – The Sound of One Hand Clapping
Various – A Little Bit of Soul
Various – To Hal and Bacharach
Best World Music Album 
Kavisha Mazzella – Fisherman's Daughter
Lisa Gerrard & Pieter Bourke – Duality
Matt Walker – I Listen to the Night
Tigramuna – Jazz Latino - Americano
Tulipan – Manic Celeste
Xylouris Ensemble – Antipodes

Artisan Awards
Song of the Year
The Whitlams – "No Aphrodisiac"
Monique Brumby – "The Change in Me"
The Fauves – "Surf City Limits"
The Living End – "Prisoner of Society"
The Mavis's – "Cry"
Producer of the Year
Magoo, Regurgitator – Regurgitator – Unit
Paul Begaud – Human Nature – Whisper Your Name
Daniel Denholm, Phil McKellar – The Cruel Sea – "Hard Times"
Charles Fisher – Savage Garden – "Universe"; – The Seekers – The Bush Girl
Rob Taylor, Tim Freedman – The Whitlams – Eternal Nightcap
Engineer of the Year 
Magoo – Midnight Oil – "White Skin / Black Heart"; – Regurgitator – Unit; – Skunkhour – "Another Childish Man", "Breathing Through My Eyes", "Opportunist", "Pulse"
Nick Launay – Silverchair – "The Door"
Nigel Derricks – Cordrazine – From Here to Wherever
Tony Espie – Wendy Matthews – Ghosts excluding "Halcyon Days"
Rob Taylor – The Whitlams – Eternal Nightcap
Best Video 
Baz Luhrmann – Christine Anu, David Hobson, Royce Doherty – "Now Until the Break of Day"
Chris Bently – Groove Terminator – "Losing Ground"
Mark Hartley – The Cruel Sea – "Takin' All Day"
Jeremy Hydnes, George Pinn – Regurgitator – "Polyester Girl"
Quan Yeomans – Regurgitator – "Black Bugs"
Best Cover Art 
The Shits – Regurgitator – Unit
Carl Breitkreuz, Ian Downie – Various – To Hal and Bacharach
Dominic O'Brien, Matt Thomas, Rachel Boyce, Alison Smith – The Mavis's – Pink Pills
William Tennent, Chris Tennent – The Superjesus – Sumo
Kevin Wilkins – Midnight Oil – 20,000 Watt R.S.L.

Outstanding Achievement Award
Savage Garden

ARIA Hall of Fame inductees
The Hall of Fame inductees were:
The Angels
The Masters Apprentices

Notes

References

External links
ARIA Awards official website
List of 1998 winners

1998 music awards
1998 in Australian music
ARIA Music Awards